Rani Mandal is a Nepali politician and a member of the House of Representatives of the federal parliament of Nepal. She was elected from Rastriya Janata Party Nepal under the proportional representation system. She is a member of the parliamentary Women and Social Welfare Committee.

References

Living people
Place of birth missing (living people)
21st-century Nepalese politicians
21st-century Nepalese women
Rastriya Janata Party Nepal politicians
Nepal MPs 2017–2022
People's Socialist Party, Nepal politicians
1974 births